Eleutherodactylus junori is a species of frog in the family Eleutherodactylidae endemic to Jamaica. Its natural habitats are subtropical or tropical moist lowland forest, rocky areas, rural gardens, and heavily degraded former forest. It is threatened by habitat loss.

References

junori
Endemic fauna of Jamaica
Amphibians of Jamaica
Amphibians described in 1926
Taxonomy articles created by Polbot